The Kabyle Provisional Government is a self-proclaimed provisional government in the form of an association formed in Paris by the Movement for the Autonomy of Kabylia and aimed at declaring the independence of Kabylia. 

Kabylia is a mountainous region, located east of Algiers, and is a traditional center of conflict. The Kabyles, who speak Kabyle (a Tamazight language), have been campaigning since the independence of Algeria for the recognition of their language and their culture.

History
A provisional government advocating the self-determination of Kabylia was formed on the evening of June 1, 2010 in Paris, "to no longer suffer injustice, contempt and domination by the government of Algiers." In a press release, Ferhat Mehenni, the president of the Movement for the Self-Determination of Kabylia (MAK), claimed that "Denied in our existence, flouted in our dignity, discriminated against on all levels, we have been denied our identity, our language, and our Kabyle culture, robbed of our natural resources, we are, to this day, administered like colonized people, even foreigners in Algeria.” He added that "Today, if we are setting up our provisional government, it is so as not to endure the injustice, contempt, domination, frustrations and discrimination that we have endured since 1962."

The Kabyle Provisional Government was then composed of a president and nine ministers, two women and seven men, from the three sub-regions of Kabylia. However, following a deep disagreement with the president who was accused of slowing down ministerial actions, the Minister of the Budget, Minister of Health and Solidarity, Minister of the Interior, and Minister for Relations with the society all resigned. A 5th minister resigned following Mehenni's election as President of MAK France. The chief of staff of the presidency was also sacked by Mehenni.

The Kabyle Provisional Government was admitted on August 31, 2013 as a full member of the Organization of Emerging African States (OEAS), an American NGO based in Washington.

On August 26, 2021, Algeria issued an international arrest warrant for Ferhat Mehenni

References

External links 
 Journal officiel du Gouvernement provisoire kabyle -en français
 Journal officiel du Gouvernement provisoire kabyle -en kabyle
 Interview Ferhat Mehenni : « Pourquoi le Gouvernement provisoire kabyle »
 News - Organization of Emerging African States
 Members - Organization of Emerging African States

Kabylie
Governments in exile
Provisional governments